Martine Ivangine (born 12 December 1947) is a French speed skater. She competed in four events at the 1968 Winter Olympics.

References

1947 births
Living people
People from Saint-Gervais, Isère
French female speed skaters
Olympic speed skaters of France
Speed skaters at the 1968 Winter Olympics
Sportspeople from Isère